The Budapest Highflyer (also known as Poltli and Budapest Coloured) is a breed of fancy pigeon developed over many years of selective breeding. Budapest Highflyers, along with other varieties of domesticated pigeons, are all descendants from the rock pigeon (Columba livia).
The breed is the most popular in its native Hungary.

See also 
List of pigeon breeds

References

Pigeon breeds
Pigeon breeds originating in Hungary